Krajišnik is a village in Serbia. It is situated in the Sečanj municipality, Central Banat District, Vojvodina province. The village has a Serb ethnic majority (91.83%) and its population is 2,241 people (2002 census).

Name

In Serbian, the village is known as Krajišnik or Крајишник, in German as Stefansfeld, in Hungarian as Istvánfölde (until 1890 Stefanföld), and in Croatian as Krajišnik. The name is derived from the word Krajina, and means "a resident of Krajina".

Its former name used in Serbian was Šupljaja / Шупљаја. This name is found in the records since 1660.

Historical population

1869: 2,329
1900: 2,344
1948: 3,926
1953: 3,733
1961: 3,357
1971: 2,712
1981: 2,495
1991: 2,428

See also
List of places in Serbia
List of cities, towns and villages in Vojvodina

References
Slobodan Ćurčić, Broj stanovnika Vojvodine, Novi Sad, 1996.

Populated places in Serbian Banat